Timothy John Rishton is a British classical concert musician, author and broadcaster, known as an advocate for the natural musical qualities of pre-1800 keyboard music.

Rishton’s organ concerts have a particularly large following in Germany and Norway (though he plays throughout Europe and occasionally in the United States), while his books and other writings (including a couple of dozen articles in both refereed and popular-academic journals) have been published largely in the US, UK and Norway.  He has recorded a number of CDs, particularly of early music.

Early life
Born in a moorland village in the Pennines of Northern England, Rishton studied in the 1980s with the Austrian organist Susi Jeans and at Reading, Manchester and Bangor universities, being awarded a Ph D in 18th-century music. He taught music at the university of Wales through the medium of Welsh (and was also Director of Music at the Collegiate Church in Holyhead) before moving to Norway where he became Associate Professor of Music at University College Tromsø, music officer for the Diocese of North-Hålogaland and leader of a course centre at Soltun Folkehøgskole.

Tim Rishton believes that music belongs in the community and therefore prefers to give concerts in villages rather than in city concert halls. He also regards music as a non-competitive activity and does not participate in competitions.

Most of his published work is written in Norwegian. From 2005 to 2009 he was Director of Studies in Continuing Music Education at Lancaster University, England, before returning to Norway.

Bibliography

    Tim Rishton, Joyful Noise? The Why, What and How of music in church. Foreword by former Archbishop George Carey. Skipton: Holy Trinity Press, 2006
    Tim Rishton, Liturgisk orgelspill. Stavanger: Cantando, 1996

References

External links

Norwegian musicians
Norwegian organists
British classical organists
British male organists
British musicologists
Norwegian musicologists
British performers of early music
Living people
21st-century organists
21st-century British male musicians
Year of birth missing (living people)
Male classical organists